Gahru (also Romanized as Gahroū; also known as Kahroū) is a city in the Central District of Kiar County, Chaharmahal and Bakhtiari province, Iran. At the 2006 census, its population was 6,093 in 1,464 households, when it was one of two cities in the former Kiar District of Shahrekord County. The following census in 2011 counted 5,949 people in 1,684 households, by which time Kiar County had been established. The latest census in 2016 showed a population of 6,263 people in 1,894 households. The village is populated by Lurs.

References 

Kiar County

Cities in Chaharmahal and Bakhtiari Province

Populated places in Chaharmahal and Bakhtiari Province

Populated places in Kiar County

Luri settlements in Chaharmahal and Bakhtiari Province